Cellach mac Faelan was the eighth of ten Kings of Leinster to be inaugurated and based on Lyons Hill, Ardclough, County Kildare, a member of the Uí Dúnchada, one of three septs of the Uí Dúnlainge dynasty which rotated the kingship of Leinster between 750 and 1050, significant in County Kildare History.

References

Ui Fiachrach
10th-century kings of Leinster